The Most Wonderful Moment is a 1957 Italian drama film directed by Luciano Emmer.

This drama deals with natural childbirth, and was described as "clinically pure, informative, edifying and, on occasion, tenderly dramatic". Pietro is in love with a nurse; they keep their affair secret until she falls pregnant. Worried that marriage will affect his career, she prepares for the upcoming childbirth.

Plot
In the maternity ward of a large Roman hospital, we witness the secret love between the young doctor Pietro Valeri and the nurse Luisa Morelli. Pietro has difficulty in making a career and hesitates to marry Luisa as he does not know what future he could offer her.

The situation seems to get worse when Luisa realizes she is expecting a baby. Pietro, always irresolute, seems to be in favor of a clandestine abortion, a solution that the girl refuses to consider. Luisa leaves the hospital and moves to her former colleague Margherita, who has set up on her own as a midwife. Margherita and Luisa organize pre-baby courses in which a revolutionary method of painless childbirth is developed, a technique learned in the same hospital where they worked.  One of the young women assisted by Margherita is hospitalized in the ward where Pietro works and actually manages to give birth in conditions of relative serenity, transforming what mothers always considered "the worst moment" into the “most beautiful moment”: the episode comforts the doctor, who finally decides to marry Luisa and assist her in her maternity leave.

Cast
 Marcello Mastroianni as Pietro Valeri
 Giovanna Ralli as Luisa Morelli
 Marisa Merlini as Margherita Rosati
 Bice Valori as Carla
 Memmo Carotenuto as Ticket collector
 Ernesto Calindri as Director of clinic
 Riccardo Garrone as Dr. Benvenuti
 Emilio Cigoli as Morelli
 Giuliano Montaldo as Don Grazini
 Sergio Bergonzelli as Mister Mancini
 Vittorio André as Prof. Grimaldi (as Victor André)
 Clara Bindi as Matilde Fontana
 Edda Soligo as Head of home

References

External links

1957 films
1957 drama films
Films scored by Nino Rota
1950s Italian-language films
Italian black-and-white films
Films directed by Luciano Emmer
Films shot in Rome
Films set in Rome
Films with screenplays by Ugo Pirro
Italian drama films
1950s Italian films